Robin Meredith Cohn Hutcheson is an American transportation official who is the administrator of the Federal Motor Carrier Safety Administration.

Early life and education 
A native of Connecticut, Hutcheson earned a bachelor's from the University of Colorado Boulder and a master's degree from the University of Utah.

Career 
From 2004 to 2006, Hutcheson worked as a transit planner in Karlsruhe, Germany. She then returned to Salt Lake City, where she worked as a senior associate at Fehr & Peers from 2006 to 2010. From 2012 to 2016, she was the transportation director of Salt Lake City. From 2016 to 2021, she served as the director of public work for Minneapolis. She was also the president of the National Association of City Transportation Officials.

In January 2021, Hutcheson became deputy secretary of transportation for safety policy in the United States Department of Transportation. She became deputy administrator and acting administrator of the Federal Motor Carrier Safety Administration (FMCSA) in January 2022.

FMCSA Nomination
In April 2022, President Joe Biden announced her nomination as the administrator of the FMCSA. Hearings on her nomination were held before the Senate Commerce Committee on June 8, 2022. Her nomination was favorably reported to the Senate floor on June 22, 2022. She was confirmed by the United States Senate via voice vote on September 22, 2022.

References 

Living people
People from Connecticut
People from Salt Lake City
University of Utah alumni
University of Colorado Boulder alumni
United States Department of Transportation officials
Year of birth missing (living people)
Biden administration personnel